Viktor Platonovych Petrov (pen names V. Domontovych, Viktor Ber; 10 October 1894 – 8 June 1969) was a prominent Ukrainian existentialist writer. Together with Valerian Pidmohylny, Petrov is considered to be the founder of the Ukrainian intellectual novel. Although Petrov is remembered as a writer today, during his life he was a scientist in the first place. He wrote papers on archaeology, anthropology, history, philosophy and literature.

Biography

Viktor Petrov was born on 10 October 1894 in Yekaterinoslav (today's Dnipro). In 1918 he graduated from historical-philological faculty of Kiev University. Later he worked at the ethnographic committee of the Ukrainian Academy of Sciences. In 1930 he obtained his doctorate for a study titled "Panteleymon Kulish in the 50s. Life. Ideology. Creativity".
During World War II he was in the territory occupied by Germans where he worked in several Ukrainian magazines and newspapers.

After World War II Petrov stayed in emigration in Germany, during which he was a professor at the Ukrainian Free University in Munich. He was also one of the founding members of the Ukrainian artist movement, a literary organization of the Ukrainian intellectual diaspora. At a later time Petrov disappeared from Germany under unknown circumstances. Later it was discovered (due to a reference to him in Aleksandr Mongait's survey book) that he returned to the Soviet Union and kept working at the Institute of Archaeology in Kyiv. Petrov died in 1969 and is buried in Kyiv.

Writings

Novels
 Without Foundation (Без ґрунту) (1942–1943) 
 Girl with a Teddy Bear (1928)
 Doctor Seraficus (1928–1929, published in 1947)
 Alina and Kostomarov (1929)
 Kulish's romances (1930)
 Doctor Seraficus (English translation of excerpt), translated by Yuri Tkacz, in Before the Storm, Ardis Publishers USA

Scientific publications
 Origin of the Ukrainian Nation
 Scythians — language and ethnicity
 Ethnogenesis of Slavs
 [ Development of Ukrainian People]
 Ukrainian cultural activists - victims of repressions

References

Literature
 Viktor Petrov in the Encyclopedia of Ukraine
 Andreyev V. "Epoch theory" by Viktor Petrov: frustrated revolution of the Ukrainian historiography // Scriptorium nostrum. - 2015. - No. 1-2. - С. 7-34

Existentialists
Ukrainian novelists
Writers from Dnipro
Taras Shevchenko National University of Kyiv alumni
1894 births
1969 deaths
Ukrainian literary critics
20th-century novelists
Soviet literary historians
Soviet male writers
20th-century male writers